Guayaquil City F.C. (known as C.D. River Ecuador until 2017) is an Ecuadorian professional football club based in Guayaquil. They currently play in the country's first-level football league—the Serie A—after gaining promotion from the segunda-level Primera Categoria.

History

Formed in 2007 as Club Deportivo River Plate Ecuador (or River Ecuador), the club was founded through a partnership with the dominant Argentinian side River Plate. By 2010 the relationship had already ended, but the club continued to operate under its given name and with River Plate's traditional red kit colour.

On 11 July 2017 it was announced that River Ecuador had renamed themselves to Guayaquil City Fútbol Club, changing their strip to sky blue and white horizontal stripes. The new name, kit colours and badge design prompted a number of claims that the change in identity was the result of a takeover by the Manchester City-linked City Football Group, though no evidence of this was forthcoming.

Statistics

Serie A
Seasons: 3 (2015, 2016, 2017)
Matches played: 132
Wins: 38
Draws: 32
Losses: 62
Goals for: 137
Goals against: 184
Goals difference: -47
Points: 146
All-time position: 7th

Serie B
Seasons: 5 (2010–2014)

Segunda Categoría
Seasons: 2 (2008–2009)

Players

Current squad

Managers
 Kléber Fajardo (2007)
 César Vigevani (2008–2010)
 Kléber Fajardo (2012)
 Humberto Pizarro (2012–2015)
 Marcelo Trobbiani (2015)
 Guillermo Sanguinetti (2016)
 Pablo Trobbiani (interim) (2016)
 Ángel Gómez (2017)
 Gabriel Perrone (2017)
 Pool Gavilánez (2017–)

External links

Official website

References

Football clubs in Ecuador
Association football clubs established in 2007
2007 establishments in Ecuador
Sport in Guayaquil